Jesse Zamudio García (born 8 March 1999) is a Mexican professional footballer who plays as a midfielder for Liga MX club León.

Career statistics

Club

Honours
León
Liga MX: Guardianes 2020
Leagues Cup: 2021

Morelia
Liga de Expansión MX: Clausura 2022

References

External links
 
 
 

Living people
1999 births
Mexican footballers
Association football midfielders
Atlético Morelia players
Club León footballers
Liga MX players
Footballers from Guanajuato